Russian History is the name of two academic journals:
 Russian History (Brill journal), an English-language quarterly journal published by Brill Publishers since 1974.
 Russian History (RAS journal) (Российская история, Rossiiskaya istoriia), a Russian-language bi-monthly journal published by the Institute of History of the Russian Academy of Sciences (RAS) since 1957. Formerly named History of the USSR (История СССР, Istoriia SSSR) (1957–1992) and  National History (Отечественная история, Otechestvennaia istoriia) (1992–2008).

See also 
 History of Russia
 List of Slavic studies journals